Vittorio Zonca (1568–1603) was an Italian engineer and writer. He wrote the Theater of machines, which was published in Padua in 1607 four years after his death.

Some of his plates were translated into Chinese by Johann Schreck and published in the 1627 Chinese book on European mechanical arts Diagrams and explanations of the wonderful machines of the Far West.

Works
 Vittorio Zonca Novo Teatro di Machine et Edificii, Padua 1607.

Notes

References
 Arnold Pacey The Maze of Ingenuity: Ideas and Idealism in the Development of Technology MIT Press, 1992 
 Francis C. Moon The Machines of Leonardo Da Vinci and Franz Reuleaux: Kinematics of Machines from the Renaissance to the 20th Century Springer, 2007 
 Joseph Needham, Ling Wang, Gwei-Djen Lu Science and civilisation in China Cambridge University Press, 1965

External links
 
Vittorio Zonca (1607) Novo teatro di machine et edificii per varie et sicure operationi - digital facsimile from the Linda Hall Library

1568 births
1603 deaths
Italian engineers
Italian male non-fiction writers
Italian science writers